Arne Torolf Strøm (1 October 1901  –  2 April 1972) was a Norwegian politician for the Labour Party.

He was born in Oslo.

He was elected to the Norwegian Parliament from Akershus in 1945, and was re-elected on three occasions.

References

1901 births
1972 deaths
Labour Party (Norway) politicians
Members of the Storting
20th-century Norwegian politicians